Ethiopia will compete at the 2022 World Athletics Championships in Eugene, United States, from 15 to 24 July 2022.

Medalists

Results
Ethiopia has entered 40 athletes.

Men 
Track and road events

Women 
Track and road events

References

External links
Oregon22｜WCH 22｜World Athletics

Nations at the 2022 World Athletics Championships
Ethiopia at the World Championships in Athletics
2022 in Ethiopian sport